Konin Voivodeship - a unit of administrative division and local government in Poland from 1975 to 1998, superseded by Greater Poland Voivodeship. Its capital city was Konin.

Major cities and towns (population in 1995)
 Konin (82,700)
 Turek (30,700)
 Koło (23,900)

See also
 Voivodeships of Poland

Former administrative regions of Greater Poland
Former voivodeships of Poland (1975–1998)
History of Łódź Voivodeship